SS Inca was a steamship on Lake Titicaca.

History
The Peruvian Corporation, a UK-owned company, had controlled Peru's railways and lake shipping since 1890. Traffic had outstripped the capacity of the corporation's hitherto largest lake steamer  (546 tons) and ageing Yavari and Yapura. Accordingly, in 1904, the corporation ordered the Inca, which at 1,809 tons was by far the lake's largest ship to date.

Earle's Shipbuilding of Kingston upon Hull on the Humber in England built Inca as a "knock down" ship; that is, they assembled her in their shipyard with bolts and nuts, marked each part with a number and then disassembled her into many hundreds of pieces and then sent her to Peru in kit form. The pieces were shipped by sea to South America and then by rail to Lake Titicaca, where Inca was finally riveted together and launched.

In the 1920s, Earle's supplied a new bottom for the ship, which also was delivered in kit form. Traffic continued to increase, so in 1929, the corporation ordered an even larger ship from Earle's, to work along with the Inca.

In 1975, the Peruvian Corporation was nationalised and Inca'''s ownership passed to the state railway company ENAFER. She survived in serviceable condition, but in 1994, Inca'' was scrapped.

References

1905 ships
Ships built on the Humber
Steamships of Peru